The 1997–98 season of the Racing Club de Lens was the 45th season of the club from Pas-de-Calais with first division championship league of France, the seventh consecutive in the elite of French football. This season was remarkable in the history of the club, because it was the first and only title that RC Lens won in French first division. The club also reached, for the third time in its history, the final of Coupe de France.

Daniel Leclercq lead the club in this season, which took place just before the World Cup hosted by France, and for which the Bollaert stadium hosted several games. Leclercq took control of the team early in the season after the previous season's deputy Roger Lemerre. This happened in 1997 to prevent a possible relegation to the second division. Leclercq set up a tactic based on offense and speed. The team relied on players present for several years, such as Jean-Guy Wallemme, a captain of the team, or the goalkeeper Guillaume Warmuz. Anto Drobnjak and Stéphane Ziani also played a central role in the team.

Sixth in the mid-season, RC Lens took the championship lead after its victory in their 30th game of the season against league-leader FC Metz. Following that victory, RC Lens remained in first place through to the end of the season. Following this winning streak in the league, RC Lens lost in the final of Coupe de France and in the semifinals of the League Cup against the Paris Saint-Germain.

Players

First-team squad
Squad at end of season

Transfers

In

Competitions

French Division 1

League table

Results summary

Results by round

Coupe de France

Coupe de la Ligue

References

External links

RC Lens seasons
Lens
French football championship-winning seasons